Chief Godswill Obot Akpabio,   (born 9 December 1962), is a Nigerian lawyer and politician. He is a former Minister for Niger Delta Affairs. He resigned on 11 May 2022 on the directive of President Muhammadu Buhari to contest in the presidential primaries of the All Progressives Congress. He also served as Governor of Akwa Ibom State, Nigeria from 29 May 2007 to 29 May 2015.

Early life and career
Godswill Akpabio is the son of Chief Obot Akpabio and Madam Lucy Obot Akpabio (née Inyangetor) of Ukana, Ikot Ntuen in Essien Udim Local Government Area. He was born on 9 December 1962. He lost his father early in life and was raised by his mother.

Education
Akpabio was educated at Methodist Primary School, Ukana, Essien Udim LGA, Akwa Ibom State; the Federal Government College, Port Harcourt, Rivers State; and the University of Calabar, Cross River State, where he obtained a Degree in Law.

While at the Federal Government College, Port Harcourt, he was appointed the Senior Prefect. In the University of Calabar, Akpabio was elected as the speaker of the parliamentary year.

Family and personal life
Akpabio’s grandfather, Okuku Udo Akpabio, was the Warrant Chief in Ikot Ekpene province. His uncle, Dr. I. U. Akpabio, was the Minister of Education/Internal Affairs in the then Eastern Nigeria. Justice Nsima Akpabio, his cousin, was a senator in the Second Nigerian Republic.

Akpabio is a Christian of the Catholic faith. Akpabio is married to Ekaette Unoma Akpabio, the founder of Family Life Enhancement Initiative (FLEI), a non-governmental organization providing a platform for redirecting the focus of development efforts on the family as a strategy for achieving the Millennium Development Goals (MDGs).

Akpabio and his wife have four daughters and a son.

Career and employment
Akpabio had a brief stint as a teacher and as an associate partner with Paul Usoro and Co., a law firm in Nigeria.

He also worked with EMIS Telecoms Limited, a wireless telecommunications company in Lagos, Nigeria. In 2002, he rose to the position of the Managing Director/Chief Executive Officer of the company. In this position, he helped in shaping the future of the burgeoning telecoms industry. He had earlier served as the National Publicity Secretary of the Association of Telecommunication Companies in Nigeria, (ATCOM), while a director of EMIS.

Appointments and politics
In 2002, he was appointed Honourable Commissioner for Petroleum and Natural Resources by the then Governor Obong Victor Attah in Akwa Ibom State. Between 2002 and 2006, he served as a Commissioner in three key ministries: Petroleum and Natural Resources, Local Government and Chieftaincy Affairs, as well as Lands and Housing.

In 2006, he aspired for the governorship of Akwa Ibom State in a contested primary election and defeated 57 other aspirants to emerge the candidate of the People’s Democratic Party (PDP). His campaign with the slogan, “let God’s will be done” received mass support and was elected Governor in 2007. He was re-elected for a second term in office as Governor of Akwa Ibom State in 2011.

In 2013, he was elected Chairman of the newly formed PDP Governors Forum.

In 2015, he contested and won the Senate seat of the Akwa Ibom North West Senatorial District (Ikot Ekpene) to represent the district in the Senate of the Federal Republic of Nigeria. Running under the platform of the People’s Democratic Party (PDP), he polled 422,009 of the 439,449 to defeat Chief Inibehe Okorie of the All Progressive Congress (APC) who recorded 15, 152 votes to be declared elected by the Independent National Electoral Commission (INEC).

Akpabio was nominated for the position of the Senate Minority Leader by the South-South caucus of the People's Democratic Party (PDP), ratified by the caucus of the PDP in the Senate and announced by the Senate President as Senate Minority Leader on 28 July 2015. The PDP lost the majority to the All Progressives Congress (APC), in the 2015 general elections.

In August 2018, Senator Akpabio resigned as the Senate Minority Leader, after he had announced his defection to the All Progressive Congress. His defection was marked by Political rally in his hometown at the Ikot Ekpene township stadium, Akwa Ibom State.

In July 2019, he was nominated by President Muhammadu buhari and screened by the Nigerian Senate for a Ministerial appointment.
On August 21, 2019, he was sworn in as Minister  of the Federal republic of Nigeria, Minister for Niger Delta Affairs.

In June 2022, Senator Godswill Akpabio resigned from his position as minister for Niger Delta. This very lucrative ministry oversees the activities of the Niger Delta Development Commission to contest as a presidential aspirant of the ruling All Progressive Congress APC but stepped down on the night of the primaries for the eventual winner of the primaries Asiwaju Bola Tinubu. A few days after the presidential primaries, Godswill Obot Akpabio emerged as the Senatorial candidate for Akwa Ibom North West Senatorial District. However, it was fraught with accusations of foul play by stakeholders of the party in the State. The party standard bearer eventually went on to defeat his closest rival of PDP to become the senator-elect in the 2023 general elections polling 115,401 votes, while Mr Enoidem scored 69,838 votes in the election. https://www.premiumtimesng.com/news/top-news/584890-nigeriadecides2023-akpabio-wins-senatorial-election.html

Corruption accusations
Godswill Akpabio was under investigation by the Economic and Financial Crimes Commission (EFCC) on accusations that he diverted over 100 billion Naira from Akwa Ibom State during his time as governor (2007-2015) with American diplomats calling the level of corruption "exceptional" during his tenure. However, no charges have been filed. A lawyer, Leo Ekpenyong who also accused Akpabio of corruption, was later arraigned by the police in court for defamation.

In May 2020, Akpabio was summoned by members of the House of Representatives over the misappropriation of 40 billion Naira.

Honours

International honours
	The Congressional Certificate of Recognition of the United States Congress (2011).
	Africa Lifetime Achievement Prize awarded by Millennium Excellence Foundation in Kenya.
	The Gold Humanitarian Services Award of the Republic of Niger 2008 conferred on him by Niger’s Ambassador to Nigeria, His Excellency, Alhaji Moussa Ibrahim.
	Exam Ethic Marshall 2009: Exam Ethic International, Ghana.
	Best Governor, Infrastructure Development 2009: BEN Television, London.
	Honorary citizen of the city of Georgia, New Jersey in United States

National honours
	Commander of the Order of the Niger (CON).
	Best Governor Infrastructure and Empowerment Award of the Central Bank of Nigeria (2012).
	Most Prolific Governor by the National Councillors’ Forum.

Academic & professional honours
	Doctorate of Management Science, Honoris Causa, Nigeria Defence Academy (2011).
	Doctorate of Law, Honoris Causa, University of Nigeria, Nsukka (2010).
	Doctorate of Law, Honoris Causa, University of Calabar, Calabar (2009).
	Doctorate of Law, Honoris Causa, University of Uyo, Uyo (2009).
	Doctorate of Public Administration (Honoris Causa), Nnamdi Azikiwe University, Awka (2009).
	Doctorate of Management Science (Honoris Causa) Federal University of Technology, Owerri (2011).
       Doctorate of Public Administration, Honoris Causa Enugu State University of Science and Technology (ESUT), Enugu (2013).
	Doctorate of Human Resource Management (Honoris Causa) Wesley University of Science and Technology, Ondo.
	Honorary Fellow of Nigeria Society of Engineers (2010) (Only fourteen non-engineers have so far been so honoured in Nigeria).
	Fellow, Kazaure Polytechnic, Kazaure (2008).
	Fellow of the Yaba College of Technology, Yaba (2011).
	Fellow of the College of Education, Bichi, and a host of others.
	Most Education Friendly Governor in Nigeria (2008) by the National Parent-Teacher Association.
	Best Booster Governor Award for Promoting Science, Technology and Mathematics by the Science Teachers Association of Nigeria.
	Goodwill Ambassador of the Nigerian Medical Association.

Media honours
	Best Governor in Africa, Africa Development Magazine.
	Governor of the Year 2012, Leadership (newspaper).
	Man of the Year 2011, Sun (newspaper).
	Best Governor in Nigeria and Outstanding Human Brand 2010: Billboard World.
	Man of the Year 2010: National Daily Newspaper.
	Governor of the Year 2010: Nigerian Tribune.
	Award of Excellence for Outstanding Performance 2010: Nigeria Union of Journalists.
	Nigeria’s Emerging Tiger 2009: Thisday Newspapers.
	Man of the Year 2009: The Daily Independent (Lagos).
	Man of the Year 2009: National Daily Newspaper.
	2008 Most Outstanding Governor in Nigeria (South South): National Daily Newspaper.
	Governor of the Year (South-South): City People Magazine.
	Best Governor Infrastructure 2009: Encomium Magazine.
	Best Governor (South South): Encomium Magazine.
	Excellency Award as Best Governor South-South 2009: Global Excellence Magazine.

See also

Akwa Ibom State People's Democratic Party
List of Governors of Akwa Ibom State

References

1962 births
Living people
Nigerian Roman Catholics
Peoples Democratic Party state governors of Nigeria
Governors of Akwa Ibom State
University of Calabar alumni
Nigerian Law School alumni
Akwa Ibom State politicians
Members of the Senate (Nigeria)